Gene "Bowlegs" Miller (May 27, 1933 – December 25, 1987) was an American trumpeter and band leader.

Biography
Miller performed in clubs on Beale Street, in Memphis, Tennessee, when that area was a flourishing center of nightlife, playing with such entertainers as Dwight "Gatemouth" Moore, Maurice Hulbert, Jr., and Ma Rainey. He played with bandleaders Tuff Green and Phineas Newborn, Sr.

Miller formed his own band, Bowlegs & His Band, in the early 1960s, playing regularly at Memphis clubs, including the Flamingo Room, Club Handy, and Currie's Club Tropicana and, later, the Rosewood, Club Paradise, and the Manhattan Club.

He directed, arranged, written, produced and played with many leading entertainers, such as Otis Redding, O. V. Wright, Little Jr. Parker, Aretha Franklin, Lou Rawls, Joe Simon, Isaac Hayes, Wilson Pickett, Jerry Butler, B.B. King, Bobby "Blue" Bland, Al Green, Denise LaSalle, Nancy Wilson, Rufus Thomas, Sam & Dave, Onzie Horne, Etta James, Ollie Nightingale, Johnny Nash, James Carr, and Willie Mitchell.

He promoted Sugar Hill Gang and LL Cool J. Also, he entertained many jazz audiences with entertainers such as Julian "Cannonball" and Nat Adderley, Dizzy Gillespie, Nina Simone, Phineas Newborn, Jr., and many others.

Miller was the orchestral leader for WDIA Radio Station Starlight and Goodwill Revues. He also worked as the southern independent record promoter for Island, Atlantic, Arista, and CBS Records of New York.  He recorded at Sun Studio, Mercury Studio, Malaco Records and Muscle Shoals. He was a regular session player at Fame Studios playing on such hits as “Tell Mama” by Etta James, "Slip Away" by Clarence Carter, “Hey Jude” by Wilson Pickett.

Miller was a native Memphian and graduate of Booker T. Washington High School.

He was honored by the Beale Street Brass Note Walk of Fame in 2011.

Discography
As sideman
1965: Otis Blue: Otis Redding Sings Soul, Otis Redding
1966: The Soul Album, Otis Redding
1966: The Exciting Wilson Pickett, Wilson Pickett
1966: Complete & Unbelievable: The Otis Redding Dictionary of Soul, Otis Redding
1967: The Sound of Wilson Pickett, Wilson Pickett
1967: The Wicked Pickett, Wilson Pickett
1968: The Dock of the Bay, Otis Redding
1968: I'm in Love, Wilson Pickett
1968: Tell Mama, Etta James
1969: Hey Jude, Wilson Pickett
1969: Boz Scaggs, Boz Scaggs
1970: Do the Funky Chicken, Rufus Thomas

References

1933 births
1987 deaths
American bandleaders
American trumpeters
American male trumpeters
Musicians from Tennessee
People from Memphis, Tennessee
20th-century American musicians
20th-century trumpeters
20th-century American male musicians